The Australian stinkfish (Callionymus australis) also known as the Northwestern Australian sawspine dragonet, is a species of dragonet only found in the Indian Ocean off of northwestern Australia.  This species grows to a length of  TL.

References 

A
Fish described in 1983
Taxa named by Ronald Fricke